The 1944 Auckland City mayoral election was part of the New Zealand local elections held that same year. In 1944, elections were held for the Mayor of Auckland plus other local government positions including twenty-one city councillors. The polling was conducted using the standard first-past-the-post electoral method.

Background
Citizens & Ratepayers
The Citizens & Ratepayers Association selected incumbent mayor John Allum to contest the mayoralty for a second term.

Labour
The Labour Party had three people nominated for the mayoralty:

Bill Anderton, MP for  since 1935 and former city councillor (1935-41)
Joe Sayegh, Labour's mayoral candidate at the previous three elections and former city councillor (1933-41)

Despite a recent announcement that Sayegh had declined to be a candidate for any public office at the elections his name was put forward by the  branch of the Labour Party. At the candidate selection meeting Anderton was selected as Labour's mayoral candidate.

Others
Victor Macky, a member of the Auckland Hospital Board, announced his intention to stand as an independent mayoral candidate. His wife Edna had stood unsuccessfully for the city council in 1929.

Mayoralty results

Councillor results

References

Mayoral elections in Auckland
1944 elections in New Zealand
Politics of the Auckland Region
1940s in Auckland